Rallicola extinctus is an extinct species of phtilopterid louse. This parasite was only known to live on the now extinct huia and is thought to have become extinct with its host. It was initially placed in its own separate genus, Huiacola, which means "huia inhabitant". It was endemic to New Zealand's North Island.

References

External links
 Article containing an image of R. extinctus.

Lice
Insects of New Zealand
Extinct animals of New Zealand
Insects described in 1990